Dziadkowo may refer to the following places in Poland:
Dziadkowo, Lower Silesian Voivodeship (south-west Poland)
Dziadkowo, Greater Poland Voivodeship (west-central Poland)